Paul Fritsch (25 February 1901 – 22 September 1970) was a French featherweight professional boxer who competed in the early 1920s. In 1920 he became the first French boxer to win an Olympic title, defeating teammate Jean Gachet in the final, despite losing to Gachet at the national championships before the Olympics. After more than 300 amateur bouts, Fritsch turned professional in 1921. He fought approximately 100 more bouts, but never won a major title. He retired from boxing in 1929 due to a retinal detachment and became a car salesman.

1920 Olympic results
Below is the record of Paul Fritsch, a French featherweight boxer who competed at the 1920 Antwerp Olympics:

 Round of 32: bye
 Round of 16: defeated George Etcell (USA)
 Quarterfinal: defeated Paul Erdal (Norway)
 Semifinal: defeated Edoardo Garzena (Italy)
 Final: defeated Jean Gachet (France)

Note: In 1920 a country could have more than one boxer per weight classification

References

1901 births
1970 deaths
Boxers from Paris
Featherweight boxers
Olympic boxers of France
Boxers at the 1920 Summer Olympics
Olympic gold medalists for France
Place of birth missing
Olympic medalists in boxing
French male boxers
Medalists at the 1920 Summer Olympics